Ballygunge Court is a 2007 Bengali film directed by Pinaki Chaudhuri and produced by Ganesh Bagaria. The film starring Soumitra Chatterjee, Mithu Chakraborty, Sabyasachi Chakraborty, Mamata Shankar and Tanusree Shankar in the lead roles. It won the National Film Award for Best Feature Film in Bengali.

Plot
 
The plot revolves with three family in an apartment named Ballygunge Court. Younger generation of the families wants to leave their old house leaving their parents.

Cast
 Soumitra Chatterjee
 Mithu Chakraborty
 Sabyasachi Chakraborty
 Mamata Shankar
 Soma Dey
 Tanusree Shankar
 Bhaswar Chattopadhyay
 Manika Chakraborty
 Moytree Mitra

References

External links
 
 Ballygunge Court  at the Gomolo

Bengali-language Indian films
2007 films
Best Bengali Feature Film National Film Award winners
2000s Bengali-language films
Indian drama films